María Gracia Manzano Arjona (born 1950) is a Spanish philosopher specializing in mathematical logic and model theory.

Manzano earned her Ph.D. in 1977 from the University of Barcelona. Her dissertation, Sistemas generales de la lógica de segundo orden [General systems of second-order logic], was supervised by Jesús Mosterín. She is a professor of logic and the philosophy of science at the University of Salamanca.

She is the author of several books on logic and model theory:
Teoría de modelos (Alianza, 1990). Translated as Model Theory (Ruy de Queiroz, trans., Oxford Logic Guides 37, Oxford University Press, 1999)
Extensions of First Order Logic (Cambridge Tracts in Theoretical Computer Science 19, Cambridge University Press, 1996)
Lógica para principiantes [Logic for beginners] (in Spanish, with Antonia Huertas, Alianza, 2004)

References

External links
Home page

1950 births
Living people
21st-century Spanish mathematicians
Spanish women mathematicians
Mathematical logicians
Women logicians
University of Barcelona alumni
Academic staff of the University of Salamanca
20th-century Spanish mathematicians
21st-century Spanish philosophers
Spanish women philosophers
20th-century Spanish philosophers
Philosophers of mathematics